Don or Donald Robinson may refer to:
 Don Robinson (American football player) (1922–2009), American football player and coach
 Don Robinson (baseball) (born 1957), American baseball player
 Don Robinson (executive), Baha Mar Resorts Ltd. president
 Don Robinson (rugby league) (1932–2017), British rugby league footballer
 Don Robinson (politician) (born c. 1919), Canadian politician
 Donald Robinson (bishop) (1922–2018), Anglican Archbishop of Sydney
 Don Robinson (American football coach), American football player and coach

See also
 Donny Robinson (born 1983), American motocross racer